The 2009–10 Anaheim Ducks season was the team's 17th season of operation (16th season of play) in the National Hockey League (NHL). The Ducks first game of the season was held at home, on October 3, 2009, against the San Jose Sharks. The season began with high hopes, but ended with disappointment for its fans and players as the Ducks failed to make the Stanley Cup playoffs for the first time since 2003–04.

Off-season
The Ducks made a major trade at the 2009 NHL Entry Draft on June 26, trading Chris Pronger and Ryan Dingle to the Philadelphia Flyers in exchange for Joffrey Lupul, Luca Sbisa, two first-round draft picks and a conditional third-round pick. The Ducks then traded the Flyers' first-round pick for a later first-round pick and a second-round pick. The trades were the first in a series of 16 trades made by the Ducks in the 2009–10 season. The club signed former Montreal Canadiens captain Saku Koivu as a free agent, while Francois Beauchemin and Rob Niedermayer departed the Ducks for other teams.

Regular season
The Ducks started the season poorly, playing under .500 for the first month. The team's top goalie, Jean-Sebastien Giguere struggled, failing to win a game until November 23. The Ducks increasingly played Jonas Hiller and the club reached the .500 mark in January. The team was not able to catch up in the standings despite improved play in the second half. Nearing the NHL trade deadline, general manager Bob Murray traded Giguere to the Toronto Maple Leafs and made several trades at the deadline.

Schedule and results

Preseason

|- align="center" bgcolor="#bbffbb"
| 1 || September 16 || Coyotes || 3–2 || SO || Pielmeier (1–0–0) || LaBarbera (0–1–0) || 13,869 || 1–0–0 || Honda Center || W1
|- align="center" bgcolor="#ffbbbb"
| 2 || September 17 || Canucks || 3–0 || || Luongo (1–0–0) || Giguere (0–1–0) || 14,528 || 1–1–0 || Honda Center || L1
|- align="center" bgcolor="#bbffbb"
| 3 || September 18 || @ Coyotes || 4–3 || OT || Pielmeier (2–0–0) || Tordjman (0–1–0) || 6,169* || 2–1–0 || Jobing.com Arena || W1
|- align="center" bgcolor="#ffbbbb"
| 4 || September 19 || @ Kings || 4–1 || || Bernier (2–0–0) || Hiller (0–1–0) || 11,995 || 2–2–0 || Staples Center || L1
|- align="center" bgcolor="#bbffbb"
| 5 || September 21 || Sharks || 3–2 || || Giguere (1–1–0) || Nabokov (1–1–0) || 14,300* || 3–2–0 || Honda Center || W1
|- align="center" bgcolor="#bbffbb"
| 6 || September 24 || @ Canucks || 3–2 || OT || Hiller (1–1–0) || Raycroft (2–1–0) || 18,630 || 4–2–0 || General Motors Place || W2
|- align="center" bgcolor="#ffbbbb"
| 7 || September 25 || @ Sharks || 6–0 || || Nabokov (2–2–0) || Pogge (0–1–0) || 16,237 || 4–3–0 || HP Pavilion at San Jose || L1
|- align="center" bgcolor="#bbffbb"
| 8 || September 27 || Kings || 5–4 || || Giguere (2–1–0) || Ersberg (0–3–0) || 15,677* || 5–3–0 || Honda Center || W1
|-
| colspan=10 | *Attendance Figure provided by ESPN

|-
| Legend:

Regular season

|-  bgcolor="#ffbbbb"
| 1 || October 3 || Sharks || 4–1 || || Nabokov (1–1–0) || Hiller (0–1–0) || 17,281 || 0–1–0 || Honda Center || L1 || bgcolor="ffbbbb" | 0
|-  bgcolor="#ffdddd"
| 2 || October 6 || @ Wild || 4–3 || OT || Backstrom (1–1–0) || Giguere (0–0–1) || 18,256 || 0–1–1 || Xcel Energy Center || O1 || bgcolor="ffbbbb" | 1
|-  bgcolor="#bbffbb"
| 3 || October 8 || @ Bruins || 6–1 || || Hiller (1–1–0) || Thomas (1–2–0) || 16,158 || 1–1–1 || TD Garden || W1 || bgcolor="ffbbbb" | 3
|-  bgcolor="#bbffbb"
| 4 || October 10 || @ Flyers || 3–2 || SO || Hiller (2–1–0) || Emery (3–1–1) || 19,603 || 2–1–1 || Wachovia Center || W2 || bgcolor="bbcaff" | 5
|-  bgcolor="#ffbbbb"
| 5 || October 11 || @ Rangers || 3–0 || || Valiquette (1–0–0) || Giguere (0–1–1) || 18,200 || 2–2–1 || Madison Square Garden || L1 || bgcolor="ffbbbb" | 5
|-  bgcolor="#bbffbb"
| 6 || October 14 || Wild || 3–2 || || Hiller (3–1–0) || Backstrom (1–3–0) || 15,111 || 3–2–1 || Honda Center || W1 || bgcolor="ffbbbb" | 7
|-  bgcolor="#ffbbbb"
| 7 || October 17 || Blues || 5–0 || || Conklin (2–0–0) || Hiller (3–2–0) || 14,902 || 3–3–1 || Honda Center || L1 || bgcolor="ffbbbb" | 7
|-  bgcolor="#ffbbbb"
| 8 || October 21 || Stars || 4–2 || || Turco (2–3–3) || Hiller (3–3–0) || 14,503 || 3–4–1 || Honda Center || L2 || bgcolor="ffbbbb" | 7
|-  bgcolor="#ffbbbb"
| 9 || October 24 || Blue Jackets || 6–4 || || Mason (5–2–0) || Giguere (0–2–1) || 14,468 || 3–5–1 || Honda Center || L3 || bgcolor="ffbbbb" | 7
|-  bgcolor="#ffbbbb"
| 10 || October 26 || Maple Leafs || 6–3 || || Gustavsson (1–2–0) || Hiller (3–4–0) || 14,291 || 3–6–1 || Honda Center || L4 || bgcolor="ffbbbb" | 7
|-  bgcolor="#bbffbb"
| 11 || October 30 || Canucks || 7–2 || || Hiller (4–4–0) || Raycroft (1–3–0) || 14,756 || 4–6–1 || Honda Center || W1 || bgcolor="ffbbbb" | 9
|-  bgcolor="#ffdddd"
| 12 || October 31 || @ Coyotes || 3–2 || SO || Bryzgalov (8–3–1) || Hiller (4–4–1) || 6,495 || 4–6–2 || Jobing.com Arena || O1 || bgcolor="ffbbbb" | 10

|-  bgcolor="#ffbbbb"
| 13 || November 3 || Penguins || 4–3 || || Fleury (10–2–0) || Hiller (4–5–1) || 16,128 || 4–7–2 || Honda Center || L1 || bgcolor="ffbbbb" | 10
|-  bgcolor="#bbffbb"
| 14 || November 5 || Predators || 4–0 || || Hiller (5–5–1) || Rinne (4–5–0) || 14,298 || 5–7–2 || Honda Center || W1 || bgcolor="ffbbbb" | 12
|-  bgcolor="#bbffbb"
| 15 || November 7 || Coyotes || 4–3 || || Hiller (6–5–1) || Bryzgalov (9–5–1) || 15,269 || 6–7–2 || Honda Center || W2 || bgcolor="ffbbbb" | 14
|-  bgcolor="#ffbbbb"
| 16 || November 11 || @ Devils || 3–1 || || Brodeur (10–4–0) || Hiller (6–6–1) || 14,123 || 6–8–2 || Prudential Center || L1 || bgcolor="ffbbbb" | 14
|-  bgcolor="#ffdddd"
| 17 || November 13 || @ Blue Jackets || 3–2 || SO || Garon (4–3–0) || Giguere (0–2–2) || 15,577 || 6–8–3 || Nationwide Arena || O1 || bgcolor="ffbbbb" | 15
|-  bgcolor="#ffbbbb"
| 18 || November 14 || @ Red Wings || 7–4 || || Howard (4–3–1) || Hiller (6–7–1) || 20,066 || 6–9–3 || Joe Louis Arena || L1 || bgcolor="ffbbbb" | 15
|-  bgcolor="#ffbbbb"
| 19 || November 16 || @ Penguins || 5–2 || || Fleury (11–6–1) || Giguere (0–3–2) || 17,052 || 6–10–3 || Mellon Arena || L2 || bgcolor="ffbbbb" | 15
|-  bgcolor="#bbffbb"
| 20 || November 19 || Lightning || 4–3 || OT || Hiller (7–7–1) || Smith (3–3–4) || 14,555 || 7–10–3 || Honda Center || W1 || bgcolor="ffbbbb" | 17
|-  bgcolor="#ffbbbb"
| 21 || November 21 || Sharks || 3–2 || || Nabokov (14–4–4) || Hiller (7–8–1) || 15,066 || 7–11–3 || Honda Center || L1 || bgcolor="ffbbbb" | 17
|-  bgcolor="#bbffbb"
| 22 || November 23 || Flames || 3–2 || SO || Giguere (1–3–2) || Kiprusoff (12–5–3) || 15,348 || 8–11–3 || Honda Center || W1 || bgcolor="ffbbbb" | 19
|-  bgcolor="#bbffbb"
| 23 || November 25 || Hurricanes || 3–2 || || Giguere (2–3–2) || Legace (2–3–2) || 14,766 || 9–11–3 || Honda Center || W2 || bgcolor="ffbbbb" | 21
|-  bgcolor="#bbffbb"
| 24 || November 27 || Blackhawks || 3–0 || || Giguere (3–3–2) || Huet (13–5–1) || 15,068 || 10–11–3 || Honda Center || W3 || bgcolor="ffbbbb" | 23
|-  bgcolor="#ffdddd"
| 25 || November 29 || Coyotes || 3–2 || OT || Bryzgalov (14–8–1) || Giguere (3–3–3) || 13,023 || 10–11–4 || Honda Center || O1 || bgcolor="ffbbbb" | 24

|-  bgcolor="#ffbbbb"
| 26 || December 1 || Kings || 4–3 || || Quick (15–9–2) || Hiller (7–9–1) || 14,231 || 10–12–4 || Honda Center || L1 || bgcolor="ffbbbb" | 24
|-  bgcolor="#ffbbbb"
| 27 || December 3 || @ Stars || 3–1 || || Turco (9–6–5) || Giguere (3–4–3) || 16,217 || 10–13–4 || American Airlines Center || L2 || bgcolor="ffbbbb" | 24
|-  bgcolor="#ffdddd"
| 28 || December 4 || @ Wild || 5–4 || SO || Backstrom (11–9–3) || Hiller (7–9–2) || 18,265 || 10–13–5 || Xcel Energy Center || O1 || bgcolor="ffbbbb" | 25
|-  bgcolor="#ffdddd"
| 29 || December 6 || Senators || 4–3 || SO || Elliott (6–5–3) || Giguere (3–4–4) || 14,946 || 10–13–6 || Honda Center || O2 || bgcolor="ffbbbb" | 26
|-  bgcolor="#bbffbb"
| 30 || December 8 || Stars || 4–3 || OT || Giguere (4–4–4) || Turco (9–6–7) || 13,861 || 11–13–6 || Honda Center || W1 || bgcolor="ffbbbb" | 28
|-  bgcolor="#ffdddd"
| 31 || December 11 || @ Red Wings || 3–2 || OT || Howard (9–7–1) || Giguere (4–4–5) || 20,066 || 11–13–7 || Joe Louis Arena || O1 || bgcolor="ffbbbb" | 29
|-  bgcolor="#bbffbb"
| 32 || December 12 || @ Blue Jackets || 3–1 || || Hiller (8–9–2) || Mason (10–10–5) || 14,461 || 12–13–7 || Nationwide Arena || W1 || bgcolor="ffbbbb" | 31
|-  bgcolor="#bbffbb"
| 33 || December 16 || @ Canucks || 3–2 || || Hiller (9–9–2) || Luongo (15–12–0) || 18,810 || 13–13–7 || General Motors Place || W2 || bgcolor="ffbbbb" | 33
|-  bgcolor="#ffbbbb"
| 34 || December 17 || @ Sharks || 4–1 || || Nabokov (17–6–) || Giguere (4–5–5) || 17,562 || 13–14–7 || HP Pavilion at San Jose || L1 || bgcolor="ffbbbb" | 33
|-  bgcolor="#bbffbb"
| 35 || December 19 || Coyotes || 4–2 || || Hiller (10–9–2) || Bryzgalov (19–10–2) || 15,107 || 14–14–7 || Honda Center || W1 || bgcolor="ffbbbb" | 35
|-  bgcolor="#bbffbb"
| 36 || December 22 || @ Avalanche || 4–2 || || Hiller (11–9–2) || Anderson (18–9–6) || 12,171 || 15–14–7 || Pepsi Center || W2 || bgcolor="ffbbbb" | 37
|-  bgcolor="#ffbbbb"
| 37 || December 23 || @ Coyotes || 4–0 || || Bryzgalov (21–10–2) || Hiller (11–10–2) || 10,030 || 15–15–7 || Jobing.com Arena || L1 || bgcolor="ffbbbb" | 37
|-  bgcolor="#ffbbbb"
| 38 || December 26 || @ Sharks || 5–2 || || Nabokov (20–6–7) || Giguere (4–6–5) || 17,562 || 15–16–7 || HP Pavilion at San Jose || L2 || bgcolor="ffbbbb" | 37
|-  bgcolor="#bbffbb"
| 39 || December 29 || Wild || 4–2 || || Hiller (12–10–2) || Harding (2–6–0) || 16,960 || 16–16–7 || Honda Center || W1 || bgcolor="ffbbbb" | 39
|-  bgcolor="#ffbbbb"
| 40 || December 31 || @ Stars || 5–3 || || Turco (13–8–8) || Hiller (12–11–2) || 18,532 || 16–17–7 || American Airlines Center || L1 || bgcolor="ffbbbb" | 39

|-  bgcolor="#ffbbbb"
| 41 || January 2 || @ Predators || 3–1 || || Rinne (17–9–2) || Hiller (12–12–2) || 16,654 || 16–18–7 || Sommet Center || L2 || 39bgcolor="ffbbbb" | 39
|-  bgcolor="#ffbbbb"
| 42 || January 3 || @ Blackhawks || 5–2 || || Niemi (10–2–1) || Giguere (4–7–5) || 21,662 || 16–19–7 || United Center || L3 || bgcolor="ffbbbb" | 39
|-  bgcolor="#bbffbb"
| 43 || January 5 || Red Wings || 4–1 || || Hiller (13–12–2) || Howard (14–9–2) || 15,531 || 17–19–7 || Honda Center || W1 || bgcolor="ffbbbb" | 41
|-  bgcolor="#bbffbb"
| 44 || January 7 || Blues || 4–2 || || Hiller (14–12–2) || Mason (11–13–6) || 14,248 || 18–19–7 || Honda Center || W2 || bgcolor="ffbbbb" | 43
|-  bgcolor="#bbffbb"
| 45 || January 9 || @ Predators || 3–2 || || Hiller (15–12–2) || Rinne (18–10–2) || 17,113 || 19–19–7 || Sommet Center || W3 || bgcolor="ffbbbb" | 45
|-  bgcolor="#bbffbb"
| 46 || January 10 || @ Blackhawks || 3–1 || || Hiller (16–12–2) || Niemi (11–3–1) || 21,708 || 20–19–7 || United Center || W4 || bgcolor="ffbbbb" | 47
|-  bgcolor="#bbffbb"
| 47 || January 13 || Bruins || 4–3 || || Hiller (17–12–2) || Rask (10–7–2) || 14,957 || 21–19–7 || Honda Center || W5 || bgcolor="ffbbbb" | 49
|-  bgcolor="#ffbbbb"
| 48 || January 14 || @ Kings || 4–0 || || Quick (24–15–3) || Hiller (17–13–2) || 18,118 || 21–20–7 || Staples Center || L1 || 49bgcolor="ffbbbb" | 49
|-  bgcolor="#bbffbb"
| 49 || January 17 || Flames || 5–4 || || Hiller (18–13–2) || McElhinney (3–6–0) || 16,153 || 22–20–7 || Honda Center || W1 || bgcolor="ffbbbb" | 51
|-  bgcolor="#bbffbb"
| 50 || January 19 || Sabres || 5–4 || || Hiller (19–13–2) || Miller (28–9–4) || 15,570 || 23–20–7 || Honda Center || W2 || bgcolor="ffbbbb" | 53
|-  bgcolor="#ffbbbb"
| 51 || January 21 || @ Sharks || 3–1 || || Nabokov (29–8–8) || Hiller (19–14–2) || 17,562 || 23–21–7 || HP Pavilion at San Jose || L1 || bgcolor="ffbbbb" | 53
|-  bgcolor="#bbffbb"
| 52 || January 23 || @ Blues || 4–3 || SO || Hiller (20–14–2) || Mason (15–15–7) || 19,150 || 24–21–7 || Scottrade Center || W1 || bgcolor="ffbbbb" | 55
|-  bgcolor="#ffbbbb"
| 53 || January 26 || @ Thrashers || 2–1 || || Hedberg (11–12–4) || Hiller (20–15–2) || 12,984 || 24–22–7 || Philips Arena || L1 || bgcolor="ffbbbb" | 55
|-  bgcolor="#ffbbbb"
| 54 || January 27 || @ Capitals || 5–1 || || Neuvirth (9–5–0) || Giguere ‡ (4–8–5) || 18,277 || 24–23–7 || Verizon Center || L2 || bgcolor="ffbbbb" | 55
|-  bgcolor="#bbffbb"
| 55 || January 29 || @ Lightning || 2–1 || SO || Hiller (21–15–2) || Niittymaki (12–11–5) || 15,230 || 25–23–7 || St. Pete Times Forum || W1 || bgcolor="ffbbbb" | 57

|-  bgcolor="#bbffbb"
| 56 || February 1 || @ Panthers || 3–0 || || Hiller (22–15–2) || Vokoun (19–18–9) || 10,843 || 26–23–7 || BankAtlantic Center || W2 || bgcolor="ffbbbb" | 59
|-  bgcolor="#bbffbb"
| 57 || February 3 || Red Wings || 3–1 || || Hiller (23–15–2) || Howard (20–13–6) || 15,180 || 27–23–7 || Honda Center || W3 || bgcolor="ffbbbb" | 61
|-  bgcolor="#ffbbbb"
| 58 || February 4 || @ Kings || 6–4 || || Quick (33–16–3) || Hiller (23–16–2) || 18,118 || 27–24–7 || Staples Center || L1 || bgcolor="ffbbbb" | 61
|-  bgcolor="#bbffbb"
| 59 || February 8 || Kings || 4–2 || || Hiller (24–16–2) || Quick (34–17–3) || 16,033 || 28–24–7 || Honda Center || W1 || bgcolor="ffbbbb" | 63
|-  bgcolor="#bbffbb"
| 60 || February 10 || Oilers || 3–2 || || Hiller (25–16–2) || Deslauriers (11–20–3) || 14,766 || 29–24–7 || Honda Center || W2 || bgcolor="ffbbbb" | 65
|-  bgcolor="#ffbbbb"
| 61 || February 13 || @ Flames || 3–1 || || Kiprusoff (27–19–9) || Hiller (25–17–2) || 19,289 || 29–25–7 || Pengrowth Saddledome || L1 || bgcolor="ffbbbb" | 65
|-  bgcolor="#bbffbb"
| 62 || February 14 || @ Oilers || 7–3 || || Hiller (26–17–2) || Deslauriers (12–21–3) || 16,839 || 30–25–7 || Rexall Place || W1 || bgcolor="ffbbbb" | 67
|-  bgcolor="#bbcaff"
| colspan="3" | Feb. 16–28: 2010 Winter Olympics || colspan="6" |       || Canada Hockey Place || colspan="2" | Vancouver, BC

|-  bgcolor="#ffbbbb"
| 63 || March 3 || Avalanche || 4–3 || || Anderson (32–17–5) || Hiller (26–18–2)|| 14,840 || 30–26–7 || Honda Center || L1 || bgcolor="#ffbbbb" | 67
|-  bgcolor="#ffbbbb"
| 64 || March 6 || @ Coyotes || 4–0 || || Bryzgalov (34–18–4) || Hiller (26–19–2) || 14,965 || 30–27–7 || Jobing.com Arena || L2 || bgcolor="#ffbbbb" | 67
|-  bgcolor="#ffdddd"
| 65 || March 7 || Canadiens || 4–3 || SO || Halak (19–10–2) || Hiller (26–19–3) || 15,883 || 30–27–8 || Honda Center || O1 || bgcolor="#ffbbbb" | 68
|-  bgcolor="#ffbbbb"
| 66 || March 9 || Blue Jackets || 5–2 || || Garon (10–9–4) || Hiller (26–20–3) || 13,700 || 30–28–8 || Honda Center || L1 || bgcolor="#ffbbbb" | 68
|-  bgcolor="#ffbbbb"
| 67 || March 12 || Predators || 1–0 || || Rinne (23–13–4) || Hiller (26–21–3) || 15,077 || 30–29–8 || Honda Center || L2 || bgcolor="#ffbbbb" | 68
|-  bgcolor="#bbffbb"
| 68 || March 14 || Sharks || 4–2 || || Hiller (27–21–3) || Nabokov (37–11–9) || 16,317 || 31–29–8 || Honda Center || W1 || bgcolor="#ffbbbb" | 70
|-  bgcolor="#bbffbb"
| 69 || March 17 || Blackhawks || 4–2 || || Hiller (28–21–3) || Crawford (0–1–0) || 15,243 || 32–29–8 || Honda Center || W2 || bgcolor="#ffbbbb" | 72
|-  bgcolor="#bbffbb"
| 70 || March 19 || Islanders || 5–4 || OT || McElhinney † (1–0–0) || Biron (5–12–4) || 14,665 || 33–29–8 || Honda Center || W3 || bgcolor="#ffbbbb" | 74
|-  bgcolor="#bbffbb"
| 71 || March 21 || Avalanche || 4–2 || || Hiller (29–21–3) || Anderson (35–21–5) || 15,528 || 34–29–8 || Honda Center || W4 || bgcolor="#ffbbbb" | 76
|-  bgcolor="#ffbbbb"
| 72 || March 23 || @ Flames || 3–1 || || Kiprusoff (32–23–9) || Hiller (29–22–3) || 19,289 || 34–30–8 || Pengrowth Saddledome || L1 || bgcolor="#ffbbbb" | 76
|-  bgcolor="#ffbbbb"
| 73 || March 24 || @ Canucks || 4–1 || || Raycroft (8–4–1) || Hiller (29–23–3) || 18,810 || 34–31–8 || General Motors Place || L2 || bgcolor="#ffbbbb" | 76
|-  bgcolor="#bbffbb"
| 74 || March 26 || @ Oilers || 3–2 || || McElhinney (2–0–0) || Deslauriers (15–26–3) || 16,839 || 35–31–8 || Rexall Place || W1 || bgcolor="#ffbbbb" | 78
|-  bgcolor="#bbffbb"
| 75 || March 29 || Stars || 3–1 || || McElhinney (3–0–0) || Lehtonen (4–3–0) || 15,070 || 36–31–8 || Honda Center || W2 || bgcolor="#ffbbbb" | 80
|-  bgcolor="#bbffbb"
| 76 || March 31 || @ Avalanche || 5–2 || || McElhinney (4–0–0) || Anderson (36–24–6) || 13,862 || 37–31–8 || Pepsi Center || W3 || bgcolor="#ffbbbb" | 82

|-  bgcolor="#ffdddd"
| 77 || April 2 || Canucks || 5–4 || SO || Raycroft (9–4–1) || McElhinney (4–0–1) || 16,534 || 37–31–9 || Honda Center || O1 || bgcolor="#ffbbbb" | 83
|-  bgcolor="#bbffbb"
| 78 || April 3 || @ Kings || 2–1 || SO || McElhinney (5–0–1) || Quick (39–24–5) || 18,118 || 38–31–9 || Staples Center || W1 || bgcolor="#ffbbbb" | 85
|- style="background: #780000; color: white"
| 79 || April 6 || Kings || 5–4 || SO || Ersberg (3–3–2) || McElhinney (5–0–2) || 16,278 || 38–31–10 || Honda Center || O1 || 86
|-  bgcolor="#ffdddd"
| 80 || April 8 || @ Stars || 3–2 || SO || Turco (22–20–11) || Hiller (29–23–4) || 18,009 || 38–31–11 || American Airlines Center || O2 || bgcolor="#ffbbbb" | 87
|-  bgcolor="#ffbbbb"
| 81 || April 9 || @ Blues || 6–3 || || Mason (30–22–8) || McElhinney (5–1–2) || 19,150 || 38–32–11 || Scottrade Center || L1 || bgcolor="#ffbbbb" | 87
|-  bgcolor="#bbffbb"
| 82 || April 11 || Oilers || 7–2 || || Hiller (30–23–4) || Deslauriers (16–28–4) || 16,392 || 39–32–11 || Honda Center || W1 || bgcolor="#ffbbbb" | 89

| Legend:

|-
|"Points" Legend:

Standings

Divisional standings

Conference standings

Player statistics

Skaters
Note: GP = Games played; G = Goals; A = Assists; Pts = Points; +/− = Plus/minus; PIM = Penalty minutes

Goaltenders
Note: GP = Games played; GS = Games started; TOI = Time on ice (minutes); W = Wins; L = Losses; OT = Overtime losses; GA = Goals against; GAA= Goals against average; SA= Shots against; SV= Saves; Sv% = Save percentage; SO= Shutouts

†Denotes player spent time with another team before joining Ducks. Stats reflect time with Ducks only.
‡Traded mid-season.
Bold/italics denotes franchise record

Awards and records

Awards

Records

Milestones

Transactions
The Ducks have been involved in the following transactions during the 2009–10 season.

Trades

|}

Free agents acquired

Free agents lost

Claimed via waivers

Lost via waivers

Lost via retirement

Player signings

Draft picks

The Ducks picks at the 2009 NHL Entry Draft in Montreal.

See also 
 Anaheim Ducks
 Honda Center
 2009–10 NHL season

Other Anaheim–based teams in 2009–10
Los Angeles Angels of Anaheim (Angel Stadium of Anaheim)
 2009 Los Angeles Angels of Anaheim season
 2010 Los Angeles Angels of Anaheim season

Farm teams

References

External links
2009–10 Anaheim Ducks season at ESPN
2009–10 Anaheim Ducks season at Hockey Reference

Anaheim Ducks seasons
Anaheim Ducks season, 2009-10
Mighty
Mighty Ducks of Anaheim
Mighty Ducks of Anaheim